The 2022 Nicholls Colonels softball team represented Nicholls State University during the 2022 NCAA Division I softball season. The Colonels played their home games at Swanner Field at Geo Surfaces Park and were led by first-year head coach Justin Lewis. They were members of the Southland Conference.

Preseason

Southland Conference Coaches Poll
The Southland Conference Coaches Poll was released on February 4, 2022. Nicholls was picked to finish seventh in the Southland Conference with 81 votes.

Preseason All-Southland team

First Team
Caitlyn Brockway (HBU, JR, 1st Base)
Cayla Jones (NSU, SR, 2nd Base)
Lindsey Rizzo (SELA, SR, 3rd Base)
Ashleigh Sgambelluri (TAMUCC, JR, Shortstop)
Chloe Gomez (MCNS, SO, Catcher)
Kaylee Lopez (MCNS, JR, Designated Player)
Jil Poullard (MCNS, SO, Outfielder)
Audrey Greely (SELA, SO, Outfielder)
Aeriyl Mass (SELA, SR, Outfielder)
Pal Egan (TAMUCC, JR, Outfielder)
Lyndie Swanson (HBU, R-FR, Pitcher)
Whitney Tate (MCNS, SO, Pitcher)
Jasie Roberts (HBU, R-FR, Utility)

Second Team
Haley Moore (TAMUCC, SO, 1st Base)
Shelby Echols (HBU, SO, 2nd Base)
Autumn Sydlik (HBU, JR, 3rd Base)
Keely DuBois (NSU, SO, Shortstop)
Bailey Krolczyk (SELA, SO, Catcher)
Lexi Johnson (SELA, SO, Designated Player)
Toni Perrin (MCNS, SR, Outfielder)
Cam Goodman (SELA, SO, Outfielder)
Alexandria Torres (TAMUCC, SO, Outfielder)
Ashley Vallejo (MCNS, SO, Pitcher)
Heather Zumo (SELA, SR, Pitcher)
Beatriz Lara (TAMUCC, JR, Pitcher)
Melise Gossen (NICH, JR, Utility)

Personnel

Schedule and results

Schedule Source:
*Rankings are based on the team's current ranking in the NFCA/USA Softball poll.

References

Nicholls
Nicholls Colonels softball
Nicholls Colonels softball